"My Lord Willoughby's Welcome Home" is a traditional English ballad of the sixteenth century. A lute version was composed by the composer John Dowland. It celebrates the return of Peregrine Bertie, Lord Willoughby to England after he had led an expeditionary force to assist the Dutch Republic in its war for independence from Spain. Willoughby was regarded as a popular Protestant hero, and the lyrics commemorate his exploits in battle.

References

Bibliography
 Graham Wade. A Concise Guide to Understanding Music. Mel Bay Publications, 2011.

English songs
Year of song unknown
Compositions by John Dowland
Lute songs